Kraskovo is a rural locality (a village) in Spasskoye Rural Settlement, Vologodsky District, Vologda Oblast, Russia. The population was 25 as of 2002.

Geography 
Kraskovo is located 27 km southwest of Vologda (the district's administrative centre) by road. Ilyinskoye is the nearest rural locality.

References 

Rural localities in Vologodsky District